La femme enfant is a 1980 French drama film directed by Raphaële Billetdoux and starring Klaus Kinski. It competed in the Un Certain Regard section at the 1980 Cannes Film Festival.

Cast
 Klaus Kinski – Marcel
 Pénélope Palmer – Élisabeth
 Michel Robin – Le père
 Hélène Surgère – La mère
 Ary Aubergé – L'épicier
 Georges Lucas – Le curé

Production
According to Raphaële Billetdoux, the shooting with Klaus Kinski was a nightmare and at one point she had the temptation to stop there, as it was no longer possible to continue. For example, during the bathing scene that Kinski is preparing for the girl, then 14-year-old Pénélope Palmer was already very anxious about shooting a nude scene, even shot in a very modest way. So Billetdoux had reduced the technical team to and set the stage so that Kinski had his back to her (and to the camera), as Palmer was about to enter the bathtub. He then freaked out: "What ?! I turn my back ?! Never ! And then, I want to see her naked ... "

See also
 Klaus Kinski filmography

References

External links

1980 films
1980 drama films
French drama films
1980s French-language films
West German films
German drama films
1980s French films
1980s German films